Domenica Leibowitz is a California-based designer, author, journalist, and activist. In 2010 she co-founded the non-profit Global Action Through Fashion and in 2014, founded the couture label, Averti.

As an author, Leibowitz wrote Chapter 4 "Social Media as a Tool for Social Change" of the book Sustainable Fashion: What’s Next and the CFDA's 2019 Guide to Sustainable Strategies, a comprehensive guide that seeks to provide a "how to" overview for achieving sustainability in fashion by simplifying its myriad complex challenges into clear, digestible resources and actions.

Leibowitz's creative work extends to art direction and production design with recent clients including Netflix, Entertainment Weekly, and HBO.

Leibowitz serves on the USA Advisory Board of Fashion Revolution, is a team member of Design for AllKind, a featured SMART Talks speaker for PREMiEREViSiON New York, and a member of the Advisory Council Activist Artists Fellowship.

Leibowitz is the creative director for a new documentary series, Generation F: A Youth Fashion Movement presented at Vogue’s Forces of Fashion 2020 Summit.

References

Living people
American designers
American women journalists
Year of birth missing (living people)
American art directors
Activists from California
21st-century American women